Yarinacocha District is one of seven districts of the province Coronel Portillo in the region Ucayali, Peru. The capital of the district is the village of Puerto Callao.

Mayors
The first mayoral term began in 1965. The following people have served as mayors of the district:

References

External links
  

Districts of the Coronel Portillo Province
Districts of the Ucayali Region